Nocardia farcinica is a species of bacteria, once thought to be associated with farcy, and a member of the genus Nocardia.  This species is very similar in phenotype to Nocardia asteroides, to the degree that some isolates of N. asteroides were later found to be Nocardia farcinica.

Pathogenicity
N. farcinica may be a causative agent of nocardiosis or of secondary infections in immunocompromised patients. Strains of this species have been isolated from human brain abscesses.

Genome
N. farcinica contains a 6 million base pair genome with an average GC content of 70.8%.  A sequenced strain, IFM 10152, is also known to contain two plasmids, pNF1 pNF2. The chromosome encodes 5,674 potential protein-coding open reading frames. This genome may have undergone numerous gene duplication events as a result of adapting to new environments.

References

Further reading

External links
Type strain of Nocardia farcinica at BacDive -  the Bacterial Diversity Metadatabase

Mycobacteriales
Bacteria described in 1889